Michael Cornacchia (born February 23, 1975) is an American actor.

Biography

Education
Michael graduated from Conestoga High School in Berwyn, Pennsylvania, and the University of Southern California with a degree in theatre.

Career
He has appeared on television shows including ER, The Practice, Six Feet Under, and CSI: NY. He did a pilot for CBS called, Blind Men and one for NBC called, Spellbound.  Michael was also in the famous internet series, Terry Tate: Office Linebacker, which was written and directed by Rawson Marshall Thurber. Michael was also in the Academy Award Nominated Short, Our Time is Up, written and directed by Rob Pearlstein. He appeared as Bobby in David Fickas', Deliverance: the Musical, which was an official selection of the Slamdance Film Festival.  He has also voiced the role of Eddie in the video game version of  Reservoir Dogs.  Michael is also well known as Jabba the Hutt and Admiral Ackbar in Patrick T. Gorman's critically acclaimed, The Star Wars Trilogy in Thirty Minutes.  Some of his voicework includes Bouncing Boy in the 2006 animated series Legion of Super Heroes, the voice of Candy from Driver Parallel Lines as well as Frankie the skua in the Academy Award Winning animated film Happy Feet and its sequel, along with various voices in Batman: Arkham Knight. Michael appeared as Burly Bruce Carter in ABC's Pushing Daisies and Carter Bump a/k/a, The Cupcake Kid, in ABC's October Road. Michael plays the security guard chasing after Hannah and Lilly while they drive off with his golf cart in Hannah Montana: The Movie.

He also guest stars in the episode, "Jake...Another Little Piece of My Heart" as a Las Vegas Cupid Preacher with a New York Italian accent in the 3rd season of Hannah Montana, the TV series. In the fall of 2009, Michael produced as well as starred in "Grey Skies," a horror film about a group of college friends who reunite to vacation in a remote location only to find that they are not alone.  Also in 2009, Michael starred alongside Rhys Darby, Sasha Alexander, and Pam Cook in Edoardo Ponti's comedy, "Coming & Going." Michael's short, "What the F&#$ Was That?!" was also completed in 2009.  A short film spoofing the popular ghost hunting shows which Michael directed, starred in, and produced.

In 2012, Cornacchia was cast in the AudioDrop production of Moonie based on Nicola Cuti's classic comic book character.

Filmography

Film

Television

Videogames

References

External links
Official Website

1975 births
Living people
American male voice actors
Male actors from Philadelphia
USC School of Dramatic Arts alumni
American male television actors